Sthelenus ichneumoneus is a species of beetle in the family Cerambycidae. It was described by Buquet in 1859.

References

Necydalopsini
Beetles described in 1859